Fitter may refer to:
 NATO reporting name Sukhoi Su-17, a Soviet attack aircraft developed from the Su-7
 Fitter (occupation), a person who uses hand tools and machine tools to make or modify parts
 Fitter (arcade game), a Taito release of the game Round-Up

People
 Alastair Fitter (born 1948), British ecologist
 Daniel Fitter (1628–1700), English Catholic clergyman
 David Fitter (born 1980), retired Australian rugby union player
 R. S. R. Fitter (1913–2005), British naturalist and author

See also
 Fitter-A, NATO designation for the Sukhoi Su-7, a Soviet attack aircraft
FETA (disambiguation)
FITA (disambiguation)
Fetter (disambiguation)
 Fitting (disambiguation)